Hawarya Krestos (died 4 May 1700) was a member of the Gondarine court and royal chronicler.

Biography
Hawarya Krestos belonged to the higher clergy (Liqawant) in the court of the Gondarine rulers and to the royal counsellors. As such, he held the title of Azzaz. Towards the end of the reign of Emperor Yohannes I, Hawarya Krestos was also granted the title of Tsehafi Taezaz and would author the Emperor's Chronicles. He also documented the church councils summoned by Emperor Yohannes I to resolve the doctrinal differences between the theological parties of Qabat and Tewahedo.  

Yohannes I died on 19 July 1682 and Iyasu ascended the throne, with the serag masare Malkea Krestos putting the crown on his head. The Tsehafi Taezaz's (Hawarya Krestos and Walda Haymanot) sent sealed letters to various countries to announce the death of Yohannes I, and that the reign of his son Iyasu I has begun.

On 19 january 1694, during the ceremony of Epiphany, Hawarya Krestos who was well versed in the art of church poetry, had the honour to improvise Qene (of the Mawaddes type) for Iyasu I.

Notes

References

17th-century Ethiopian people
History of Ethiopia